Tokyo Baptist Church (Japanese: 東京バプテスト教会) is an international church in Shibuya, Japan.

Current

Senior Pastor
 Takeshi Yozawa

Branches
Tokyo Baptist Church has two multi site campuses in Misato, Saitama and Tachikawa, Tokyo.

Parent
Part of the Southern Baptist Convention through membership of the Hawaii Pacific Baptist Convention.

Worship Services 
The church has worship services in English (with Japanese subtitles and written translations) five times (on Saturday: 7:00pm and Sunday: 9:00am, 11:00am, 3:00pm, 5:00pm).

References

 Word of Life: Christian Data Book web　https://www.church-info.jp/search/detail.php?key=14110166 (Only in Japanese)

External links
 Church Website 

 Church Vimeo site (Sermon)

Churches in Tokyo
Buildings and structures in Shibuya